James R. McFarland was an American politician from Arizona.  He served two terms in the Arizona State Senate during the 9th and 10th Arizona State Legislatures, holding one of the two seats from Yavapai County.  In 1928, McFarland ran for one of the two seats from Yavapai County for the Arizona State Senate.  He received the highest vote count of the three Democrats in the primary, and then he and incumbent A. H. Favour won in November's general election.  In 1930 both McFarland and Favour were re-elected.  In January 1931, McFarland resigned his post in the State Senate.

References

Democratic Party Arizona state senators
20th-century American politicians